In-A-Gadda-Da-Vida is the second studio album by the American rock band Iron Butterfly, released in June 1968. It is most known for its title track, a 17-minute composition which occupies the whole of Side B.

The In-A-Gadda-Da-Vida album peaked at number 4 on the Billboard albums chart. It sold more than eight million copies within its first year of release, outselling every record in the history of recorded music to that time, and achieved worldwide sales of over 30 million copies. It was the biggest selling album for the year 1969 in the US. For a number of years it was the biggest selling item in Atlantic Records' catalogue. It was officially certified a Gold album in 1968 in the United States, then on January 26, 1993, it was certified 4× Platinum.

Reception

In a retrospective review for AllMusic, Stephen Thomas Erlewine calls the title track "the epitome of heavy psychedelic excess," and feels that the rest of the songs "qualify as good artifacts." It was voted number 783 in Colin Larkin's All Time Top 1000 Albums.

Track listing

Original LP

1995 deluxe edition bonus tracks

Deluxe edition
A "deluxe edition" of In-A-Gadda-Da-Vida was released in 1995. It included material from newly discovered first-generation master tapes, bonus recordings, and a 36-page booklet with photos. This re-release includes three versions of "In-A-Gadda-Da-Vida": the 17:05 studio version; the 19-minute live version from Iron Butterfly's Live (which includes a short organ intro), and the 2:52 single edit. The deluxe edition also includes a new cover, similar to the original, but with a moving butterfly flapping its wings and the band members jamming to the song.

Personnel
Iron Butterfly
 Erik Brann – guitar, vocals (track 4)
 Ron Bushy – drums, percussion
 Lee Dorman – bass guitar, backing vocals
 Doug Ingle – Vox Continental organ, vocals

All arrangements by Iron Butterfly

Technical
 Jim Hilton – producer, engineer
 Bill Cooper – mixing engineer
 Don Casale – engineer
 Loring Eutemey – artwork
 Stephen Paley – photography

Charts

Certifications

Singles
US singles
 "In-A-Gadda-Da-Vida" b/w "Iron Butterfly Theme" (both are edited versions) – Atco 6606
 "In-A-Gadda-Da-Vida" b/w "Soul Experience" – Atlantic Oldies Series 13076

Overseas singles
 "In-A-Gadda-Da-Vida", "Flowers and Beads" b/w "My Mirage" (EP release)
 "Termination" b/w "Most Anything You Want"

References

Iron Butterfly albums
1968 albums
Atco Records albums
Atlantic Records albums
Albums recorded at Gold Star Studios